Shayan Sheikh (born 5 May 1998) is a Pakistani cricketer. He made his List A debut for Khan Research Laboratories in the 2017–18 Departmental One Day Cup on 9 January 2018. He made his first-class debut for Khan Research Laboratories in the 2018–19 Quaid-e-Azam Trophy on 19 November 2018.

References

External links
 

1998 births
Living people
Pakistani cricketers
Khan Research Laboratories cricketers
Place of birth missing (living people)